Charlie Mullany (3 June 1881 – 28 April 1937) was an Australian rules footballer who played with St Kilda in the Victorian Football League (VFL).

References

External links 

1881 births
1937 deaths
Australian rules footballers from Victoria (Australia)
St Kilda Football Club players